Nayereh Ebtehaj-Samii (1914–2017) was an Iranian educator and politician. In 1963 she was one of the first group of women elected to the National Consultative Assembly.

Biography
Ebtehaj-Samii was born in Rasht in 1914. After being educated at a local Presbyterian Missionary school, she then attended the American Missionary School in Tehran. She studied for a bachelor's degree in Persian language and later became the first woman to earn a bachelor's degree in English at the University of Tehran. A member of the Women's Council, she became the first president of the Tehran chapter of Zonta International.

Women were granted the right to vote in 1963, and in the parliamentary elections that year, Ebtehaj-Samii was one of six women elected to the National Consultative Assembly. A founder member of the Iran Novin Party, she was re-elected in 1967 and 1971. After joining the Rastakhiz Party, she was re-elected again in 1975, and was the first woman to serve as Deputy Speaker.

Following the Iranian Revolution, she withdrew from politics and moved to the United States. However, she later returned to Iran, settling in Bandar-e Anzali, before moving back to Rasht. She died in April 2017 aged 103.

References

1914 births
People from Rasht
University of Tehran alumni
Iranian educators
20th-century Iranian women politicians
20th-century Iranian politicians
Members of the 21st Iranian Majlis
Members of the 22nd Iranian Majlis
Members of the 23rd Iranian Majlis
Members of the 24th Iranian Majlis
Deputies of Rasht for National Consultative Assembly
Iran Novin Party politicians
Rastakhiz Party politicians
Iranian expatriates in the United States
2017 deaths